The 2016 Prueba Villafranca de Ordizia was the 93rd edition of the Prueba Villafranca de Ordizia road bicycle race. The race took place on 25 July 2016. It was  won by British rider Simon Yates.

Race report 
An overcast and sticky morning in Northern Spain welcomed the riders to the start line for the early roll out towards the hills of the Basque country.

After 45 kilometers of racing the leaders had over four minutes advantage with much climbing ahead.

 controlled the front of the race for most of the 165.7 kilometers before super-domestique Damien Howson moved up the road as the breakaway was neutralized towards the final climb.

Howson perfectly set up Simon Yates for the winning move with a blistering attack ahead of the final climb, thinning out the field before the acceleration of Yates.

With a few kilometers to go Yates made the decisive attack on the last climb, holding off Angel Madrazo, Alexander Vdovin, Javier Moreno, and David Belda to take an impressive solo victory and set the race record for the fastest ascent of the final climb.

Results

References 

Prueba
Prueba